The Microsoft Distributed Transaction Coordinator (MSDTC) service is a component of Microsoft Windows that is responsible for coordinating transactions that span multiple resource managers, such as databases, message queues, and file systems.  MSDTC is included in Windows 2000 and later operating systems, and is also available for Windows NT 4.0.

MSDTC performs the transaction coordination role for components, usually with COM and .NET architectures. In MSDTC terminology, the director is called the transaction manager.

By default, the Microsoft Distributed Transaction Coordinator (MSDTC) service is installed with Windows 2000. It cannot be uninstalled through Add/Remove Programs.

See also
Microsoft Transaction Server
List of Microsoft Windows components
Kernel Transaction Manager
Windows Vista I/O technologies

External links
Distributed Transaction Coordinator on the Microsoft Developer Network
; Mohsen Agsen is a Technical Fellow who formed the core transaction group, which designed and delivered the Distributed Transaction Coordinator (DTC)

Transaction processing
Windows components